First Lady of South Africa is the title held by the wife or most senior wife of the president of South Africa. The title can occasionally be used for the daughter or other female relative of the president.

First ladies of South Africa

Apartheid era

Post-Apartheid era

See also
 President of South Africa
 State President of South Africa

Notes

References

South Africa
Politics of South Africa
Presidents of South Africa
South African women in politics